DWKI (95.1 FM), broadcasting as 95.1 Kiss FM, is a radio station owned and operated by DCG Radio-TV Network (formerly known as ConAmor Broadcasting Systems). The station's studio is located at 1022 DCG Tower 1, Maharlika Hi-Way, Brgy. Isabang, Tayabas. Its transmission facilities are located at Mount Banoy, Talumpok Silangan, Batangas City.

History
The station was signed on in 1989 as 95.1 KI FM, with an Adult Contemporary format. In the early 2000s, it rebranded as 95.1 Kiss FM, with a Classic hits format. In July 2015, the station transferred from its long-time former studios in Broadcast Village, Brgy. Ibabang Dupay, Lucena, to the newly inaugurated 1022 DCG Tower 1 in Tayabas. Over the recent years, it has evolved into a Full service station, airing talk during mornings & parts of the afternoon, but retaining its music format throughout the rest of the day.

95.1 Kiss FM is known to broadcast at a very powerful reach that its signal even extends to Makati in the north, Quezon City, Boracay in the south and Naga City, Camarines Sur in the southeast via unclear signal and due to same conflict frequency of RW 95.1 FM (an FM radio station in Pampanga). Thus, it is also called as "South Luzon's FM station" by some. It is also the only FM station broadcasting out of Lucena City to reach the entire Quezon province, given the latter's vast territory.

References

External links
 Kiss FM broadcast stream link
 Kiss FM discussion board where even the station owner responded to some of the messages

Radio stations in Lucena, Philippines
Oldies radio stations in the Philippines
Radio stations established in 1986
1986 establishments in the Philippines